Philotheca obovatifolia, commonly known as mountain wax-flower, is a species of flowering plant in the family Rutaceae and is endemic to eastern Australia. It is a small shrub with broadly egg-shaped leaves with the narrower end toward the base and densely crowded near the ends of the glandular-warty branchlets, and cream-coloured flowers tinged with pink and arranged singly or in groups of up to five in leaf axils.

Description
The ten stamens are hairy.

Taxonomy and naming
This philotheca was first formally described in 1998 by Michael J. Bayly who gave it the name Philotheca myoporoides subsp. obovatifolia and published the description in the journal Muelleria. In 2005 Paul Irwin Forster raised the subspecies to species status as Philotheca obovatifolia in the journal Austrobaileya.

Distribution and habitat
Philotheca obovatifolia grows in heath and woodland on Mount Barney, Mount Lindesay and Mount Ernest in south-east Queensland and in Werrikimbe National Park in north-eastern New South Wales.

Conservation status
Philotheca obovatifolia is classified in New South Wales as "endangered" under the New South Wales Government Biodiversity Conservation Act 2016. Only three populations are known in a small area in Werrikimbe National Park where the main threats to the species include inappropriate fire regimes, forestry activities and disturbance by feral pigs.

References

obovatifolia
Flora of New South Wales
Flora of Queensland
Sapindales of Australia
Plants described in 1998